Our Memories of Elvis is an Elvis Presley album released in February 1979 by RCA Records. This was the first of two albums in the Our Memories series. As with Volume 2, this album featured 10 songs recorded in the 1970s that were stripped down to just the basic rhythm section and Presley. All overdubs of backup singers, orchestration and horns were removed in the remix. The album spun off just one single release, "Are You Sincere", backed with "Solitaire". The album peaked at number six on the Billboard Top Country albums chart on April 27, 1979, and at number 132 on the Billboard 200 album chart.

Track listing

Charts

References

1979 compilation albums
Elvis Presley compilation albums
Compilation albums published posthumously